Aukum (Miwok: Ochum), officially Mount Aukum, is an unincorporated community in El Dorado County, California. The ZIP code is 95656.

The Aukum post office operated from 1895 to 1914 and 1920 to 1961, when it was changed to Mount Aukum.

References

Unincorporated communities in California
Unincorporated communities in El Dorado County, California
Populated places established in 1895
1895 establishments in California